Blockade is a patience or solitaire card game which uses two decks of 52 playing cards each. As in most solitaire games, the object of the game is to play the cards into the eight foundations.  The play is reminiscent of the popular solitaire game, Forty Thieves, but with 12 piles instead of 10.

Rules
The game starts with twelve piles, each containing a card (the rest form the stock). Cards are built down by suit (e.g., 7-6-5-4) and cards or groups of cards can be moved from one pile to another or to the foundations. The foundations are built up also by suit, starting from the ace. An empty pile will be filled up immediately by a card from the stock.

When all possible moves are done without success, a card is dealt onto each pile, even with those that have sequences. This and the placing of cards on empty piles is done until the stock runs out. After that, any card or group of cards can be placed on any empty space.

The game is won when all 104 cards are successfully moved to the foundations.

See also
 List of solitaires
 Glossary of solitaire

References

Half-open packers
Double-deck patience card games
Year of introduction missing